Bob Owens (born c. 1946) is an American football coach. He is the head football coach at Chapman University in Orange, California, a position he has held since 2006. Owens served as head football coach at Whittier College in Whittier, California from 1996 to 2002. He was an assistant coach for the Sacramento Surge of the World League of American Football (WLAF) in 1992 when the team won World Bowl '92.

Head coaching record

References

External links
 Chapman profile

1946 births
Living people
Chapman Panthers football coaches
Chico State Wildcats football coaches
Fresno State Bulldogs football coaches
Humboldt State Lumberjacks football coaches
Nevada Wolf Pack football coaches
Oregon Ducks football coaches
Utah State Aggies football coaches
Sacramento Surge coaches
Whittier Poets football coaches
California State University, Chico faculty
University of Oregon faculty
Whittier College faculty
University of La Verne alumni
University of Oregon alumni
African-American coaches of American football
20th-century African-American sportspeople
21st-century African-American sportspeople